Villefranche-du-Périgord is a railway station in Villefranche-du-Périgord, Nouvelle-Aquitaine, France. The station is located on the Niversac - Agen railway line. The station is served by TER (local) services operated by SNCF.

Train services
The following services currently call at Villefranche-du-Périgord:
local service (TER Nouvelle-Aquitaine) Périgueux - Le Buisson - Monsempron-Libos - Agen

References

Railway stations in France opened in 1863
Railway stations in Dordogne